This is the discography of American rapper Baby Bash.

Albums

Studio albums

Collaboration albums
Welcome to Da Tilt with Potna Deuce (1994)
Latino Velvet Project with Latino Velvet (1997)
Velvet City with Latino Velvet (2000)
Wanted with Lone Star Ridaz (2001)
Velvetism with Jay Tee (2002)
M.S.U. with Jay Tee (2012)
Playamade Mexicanz with Lucky Luciano (2012)
The Legalizers: Legalize or Die, Vol. 1 with Paul Wall (2016)
Sangria with Frankie J (2017)
The Legalizers, Vol. 2: Indoor Grow with Paul Wall (2018)

Compilation albums
What's Really! Game One (2000)
Get Wiggy! (2002)
The Ultimate Cartel with Flatline Records (2003)
Ménage à Trois (2004)
So Quick...Like a Heist with A-Wax (2004)

Mixtapes
Menudo Mix with Latino Velvet (2004)
The Camp Is Back with Latino Velvet (2007)

Singles

As lead artist

As featured artist

Other charted songs

References

Hip hop discographies
Discographies of American artists